is a Japanese footballer currently playing as a defender for Verspah Oita.

Career statistics

Club
.

Notes

References

External links

1996 births
Living people
Japanese footballers
Association football defenders
Japan Football League players
J3 League players
FC Imabari players
Fujieda MYFC players
Verspah Oita players